The Public Procurement Service (PPS) is a governmental organization in South Korea and is run under the Ministry of Economy and Finance. It is tasked with the purchasing, supply and management of materials required for major building works in the country. The headquarters are in Seo District, Daejeon.

PPS is member of the Procurement G6, an informal group leading the use of framework agreements and e-procurement instruments in Public procurement.

References

External links

Official website 

Government agencies of South Korea
South Korea